Remission often refers to:
Forgiveness

Remission may also refer to:

Healthcare and science
Remission (medicine), the state of absence of disease activity in patients with a chronic illness, with the possibility of return of disease activity
Remission (spectroscopy), the reflection or scattering of light by a material

Law
Clemency, the reduction of a prison sentence
Remand (court procedure), legal proceedings by which a case is sent back to a lower court from which it was appealed, with instructions for further proceedings

Music
Remission (EP), a 1984 extended play record by Skinny Puppy
Remission (Mastodon album), the debut album by the American metal band Mastodon

See also
Re-Mission, a 2006 video game for young cancer patients
Remittance